Linda Cerruti (born 7 October 1993) is an Italian competitor in synchronised swimming who competed at the 2011 World Aquatics Championships, 2013 World Aquatics Championships, 2010 European Aquatics Championships, 2012 European Aquatics Championships. and in Duet at the 2020 Summer Olympics. She also competed at the 2022 World Aquatics Championships in Budapest, Hungary and at the 2022 European Aquatics Championships in Rome, Italy.

Background
Cerruti is an athlete of the Gruppo Sportivo della Marina Militare.

Career

2022 European Aquatics Championships
On the second day of artistic swimming at the 2022 European Aquatics Championships, held in Rome in August, she won her first medal of the day, a silver medal in the solo technical routine, with a score of 90.8839 points. Later in the day, she won a silver medal in the highlights routine, helping achieve a score of 91.7000 points. One day earlier, she won her first silver medal as part of the team technical routine with a score of 90.3772 points. The third day, she won a bronze medal in the duet free routine, scoring 91.7000 points with her partner Costanza Ferro. On day four, she won the silver medal in the solo free routine with a score of 92.1000 points. Later in the day, she won a sixth medal, a silver medal as part of the team in the free combination routine, helping achieve a score of 92.6667 points. The fifth and final day, she and Costanza Ferro won the bronze medal in the duet technical routine with a score of 90.3577 points. For her eighth and final medal, she won a silver medal in the team free routine with a final score of 92.6667 points.

References

External links

 
 
 
 

1993 births
Living people
Italian synchronized swimmers
Olympic synchronized swimmers of Italy
Synchronized swimmers at the 2016 Summer Olympics
Synchronized swimmers at the 2020 Summer Olympics
World Aquatics Championships medalists in synchronised swimming
Synchronized swimmers at the 2011 World Aquatics Championships
Synchronized swimmers at the 2013 World Aquatics Championships
Synchronized swimmers at the 2015 World Aquatics Championships
Synchronized swimmers at the 2017 World Aquatics Championships
Artistic swimmers at the 2019 World Aquatics Championships
Artistic swimmers at the 2022 World Aquatics Championships
Universiade medalists in synchronized swimming
Universiade bronze medalists for Italy
European Aquatics Championships medalists in synchronised swimming
European Championships (multi-sport event) bronze medalists
People from Savona
Artistic swimmers of Marina Militare
Medalists at the 2013 Summer Universiade
Sportspeople from the Province of Savona